Orangeville is a city in northwestern Emery County, Utah, United States, at the edge of the Manti-La Sal National Forest. The city is at the junction of State Routes 29 and 57, straddling the banks of Cottonwood Creek. The population was 1,470 at the 2010 census.

Geography

Demographics

As of the census of 2000, there were 1,398 people, 430 households, and 350 families residing in the city. The population density was 1,073.5 people per square mile (415.2/km2). There were 471 housing units at an average density of 361.7 per square mile (139.9/km2). The racial makeup of the city was 98.43% White, 0.07% African American, 0.43% Native American, 0.14% Asian, 0.50% from other races, and 0.43% from two or more races. Hispanic or Latino of any race were 1.22% of the population.

There were 430 households, out of which 51.4% had children under the age of 18 living with them, 73.7% were married couples living together, 4.7% had a female householder with no husband present, and 18.4% were non-families. 16.7% of all households were made up of individuals, and 6.0% had someone living alone who was 65 years of age or older. The average household size was 3.25 and the average family size was 3.68.

In the city, the population was spread out, with 38.4% under the age of 18, 8.6% from 18 to 24, 25.9% from 25 to 44, 19.2% from 45 to 64, and 7.9% who were 65 years of age or older. The median age was 29 years. For every 100 females, there were 97.2 males. For every 100 females age 18 and over, there were 95.7 males.

The median income for a household in the city was $45,057, and the median income for a family was $48,942. Males had a median income of $43,382 versus $21,667 for females. The per capita income for the city was $15,160. About 4.2% of families and 7.0% of the population were below the poverty line, including 7.8% of those under age 18 and 3.5% of those age 65 or over.

History
Orangeville was founded in 1878 and was originally known as Upper Castle Dale. In 1879 when a post office was established, it was named Orangeville after Orange Seely, the first man called to settle Castle Valley.

Naming the Town
Seely attempted to get the incoming settlers to stay on one side of the creek or the other, but they failed to heed him. Ultimately, two settlements about four miles apart developed, one on the northwest side of the creek, the other on the southeast, and the settlers decided that each should have a name. A real misunderstanding arose. "Some contended that the lower town, now Castle Dale, should have been Orangeville because it was the home of Bishop Orange Seely, in whose honor the name was suggested by Erastus Snow, and Orangeville should have retained the original name of Castle Dale because the settlers first located there. A friendly rivalry soon sprang up. Orangeville people were dubbed 'Skillet Lickers,' because molasses was made there, while the Castle Dale people were called 'Woodenshoes' implying that Danes had settled there."<Daughters of Utah Pioneers. An Enduring Legacy, - Vol. I-XII, Salt Lake City, Utah: Utah Printing Company, 1978.>

Mine disaster

The disaster was the worst coal mine fire in Utah history. The escape route of the 27 persons was cut off when the fire quickly engulfed the intake of the 5th Right longwall. The fire was caused by a faulty air compressor, which was allowed to run unattended in an area that was not fire-proofed.

References

External links
 Orangeville City at Emery County official website

Cities in Utah
Cities in Emery County, Utah
Populated places established in 1877
1877 establishments in Utah Territory